Sergison Bates architects is an architectural practice with an office in London and Zürich. It was founded by Jonathan Sergison (born 1964) and Stephen Bates (born 1964) in 1996 in London. In addition to the two founding partners, their long-standing collaborator Mark Tuff has been a partner of the practice (since 2006). Sergison Bates architects are best known for their residential buildings but have also realised public and institutional projects in the UK, continental Europe and China. In addition to their work as practising architects both Jonathan Sergison and Stephen Bates have taught architecture at various universities. Jonathan Sergison is a professor at the Accademia di Architettura in Mendrisio (since 2008), whilst Stephen Bates is Professor and joint head of the Department for Urban Planning and Housing (Lehrstuhl für Städtebau und Wohnungswesen) at the Technical University of Munich together with Bruno Krucker (since 2009). Both architects have written and lectured on a wide range of topics related to architectural design. In 2006 they were awarded the prestigious Heinrich Tessenow Gold Medal and Erich Schelling Medal for their contribution to architecture.

Buildings 
Jonathan Sergison and Stephen Bates met in London in the early 1990s and were part of a group of architects, theorists and artists who met regularly between 1994 and 1995. The group (informally called Papers on architecture) had a common interest in the urban character of London and the work of Alison and Peter Smithson. Among the earliest realised projects by Sergison Bates architects are the public house (pub) in Walsall and the semi-detached house in Stevenage, both of which use motifs of informal architecture. A number of other small scale projects, primarily in London, followed, which also displayed an interest in creating a robust architectural expression through the use of lightweight low-tech construction methods (i.e. thin brick-slip façade panels on the Studio house in Bethnal Green and cement boards as cladding for a timber panel structure in the self-build housing project in Tilbury). This preoccupation with breathing layered wall constructions culminated in the exhibition project and book “Brick-work: thinking and making”. The unrealised competition design for a museum on the Danish island Bornholm (included in “Brick-work”) indicated a shift towards a more heavy and monolithic construction form and spatial expression. Two examples of this change in direction are the Urban housing project in Finsbury Park built with a loadbearing wall of brickwork and precast concrete, and the Centre for the applied arts in Ruthin that adopted structure and pigmented façade elements made of concrete cast in situ. From 2010, Sergison Bates architects were awarded commissions through design competitions for projects in Flanders (Belgium), Switzerland and Austria. In 2016 the firm completed their most prestigious building to date, the Welcome centre and offices for the Novartis Institutes for BioMedical Research in Shanghai (China).

Writing 
In addition to their built work, Sergison Bates have produced a significant output of texts, either co-written or authored independently. These were developed from lectures notes or articles for architectural magazines. So far Jonathan Sergison and Stephen Bates have published three collections of essays: Papers (2002), Papers 2 (2007) and Papers 3 (2016) comprising 54 essays in total. The texts can be described as phenomenological observations of the built environment. The architects consider the process of writing an integral part of the reflective work of architectural design. In the introduction to a lecture given at the Harvard School of Design, Iñaki Abalos described Sergison Bates’ work and approach to architecture as follows: "In my opinion there is a serious understanding of the meaning of the notion of material cultural in their work, combined with a radical sense of provocation. Radical in the etymological sense, because it goes to the roots, to the radice, the origins and sense of our historical, typological and material patrimonies, understood as the main references an architect has to deal with if he or she pretends to have a sense of time of the city as a collective cultural construction."

Approach and influences 
In the Essay “Tectonic presence” Irina Davidovici describes the work of Sergison Bates architects as oscillating between the complementary aspects of the “formal” and the “tectonic” where “the use of images has always been sustained by constructional research”. In the preface to the catalogue of selected works published in 2006, the renowned architectural historian Ákos Morávanszky states that the architecture of Sergison Bates is concerned with “precision” interpreted as an “expression that unveils the significance of nuance”. In addition to their identity-defining interest in the work of the Smithsons (both their buildings and writings) – as well as “images of ordinary typologies”, the work of Sergison Bates is inspired by English classicism, as exemplified in their fascination with Hardwick Hall. Finally, Sergison Bates have also stated that the work and ideas of Heinrich Tessenow resonate with their approach to architecture.

Selected projects 
KANAL — Centre Pompidou, Brussels, Belgium

Welcome Centre and offices, Shanghai, China 2016

Care home, Wingene, Belgium 2016

Suburban housing, Aldershot, Hants 2016

University campus, Whitechapel, London 2015

Urban housing and studios, Nordbahnhof, Vienna, Austria 2013

House, Cadaqués, Spain 2011

Urban housing and crèche, Geneva, Switzerland 2011

Care home, Huise-Zingem, Belgium 2011

City library, Blankenberge, Belgium 2011

Urban housing, Finsbury Park, London 2008

Centre for the applied arts, Ruthin, Wales 2008

Holiday house, Tisbury, Wiltshire 2004

Studio house, Bethnal Green, London 2004

Suburban housing, Stevenage, Herts 2000

Public house, Walsall, West Midlands 1998

(The listed years indicate the year of completion)

Publications 
El Croquis no. 187, December 2016 

Papers 3, Quart Verlag, Luzern 2016 

Buildings, Quart Verlag, Luzern 2012 

Papers 2, London 2007 

Brick-work: thinking and making, gta Verlag, Zurich 2005 

2G no. 34: Sergison Bates, Gustavo Gili, Barcelona 2005 

Papers, London 2001

Awards 
RIBA South Awards 2016, (Suburban housing, Aldershot, Hampshire)

RIBA National Awards 2015 (Hult International Business School, London)

RIBA Regional London Awards 2015 (Hult International Business School, London)

Österreichischer Bauherrenpreis 2014 (Urban housing, Vienna, Austria)

International Society of Typographic Designers Certificate of excellence 2014 (Buildings, Quart Verlag, Lucerne 2013)

DAM Architectural Book Awards 2013 (Bauten, Quart Verlag, Lucerne 2013)

Distinction Romande d'Architecture 2014, (Urban housing and crèche, Geneva, Switzerland)

RIBA International Awards 2012 (Urban housing and crèche, Geneva, Switzerland)

Dewi-Prys Thomas Prize 2009, (Centre for the applied arts, Ruthin, Wales, UK)

RIBA Awards 2009 (Centre for the applied arts, Ruthin, Wales)

RIBA Awards 2009 (Urban housing, Finsbury Park)

Heinrich Tessenow Gold Medal for Architecture 2006

Erich Schelling Medal for Architecture 2006

D&AD Yellow Pencil Award 2006 (Brick-work: thinking and making, Quart Verlag 2005)

Housing Design Awards 2004 (Mixed-use development, Wandsworth, London)

Housing Design Awards 2003 (Self-build housing project, Tilbury, Essex)

Wood Awards 2003 (Self-build housing, Tilbury, Essex)

Housing Design Award 2000 (Suburban housing, Stevenage, Hertfordshire)

D&AD Award 2000 (FSB exhibition stand at Spectrum Product Fair, Earls Court, London in collaboration with Adam Levene)

CAMRA best pub award, New-build category 1999 (Public house, Walsall, West Midlands)

References

External links 
 www.sergisonbates.co.uk

Interview with Stephen Bates on Education, Research and Practice in Architecture 2011 www.youtube.com/watch?v=sHI3dMhsUbk

Jonathan Sergison “Continuity and difference”, Ordine Architetti, Milano 2013 www.youtube.com/watch?v=RYLd8YvE-5E

Stephen Bates and Jonathan Sergison “On continuity”, GSD, Harvard University 2014 https://www.youtube.com/watch?v=PgOk0qCbkSc&t=48s

Stephen Bates “Dwelling” Bozar, Brussels 2015 www.youtube.com/watch?v=ZAFuLMxcYxY

Architecture firms based in London
Architecture firms of Switzerland